Short calendar could refer to:

 The 260 day ritual calendars used by several Mesoamerican civilisations
 Tzolkʼin, the version used by the Maya
 Tōnalpōhualli, the version used by the Mexica
 Short cause in legal proceedings
 Season 1, episode 2 of Judging Amy, a legal drama
 A short calendar spread, a financial trade on futures or options which are expected to fall in value